Haut-Martelange (Luxembourgish: Uewermaartel) is a village in northwestern Luxembourg.

It is situated in the commune of Rambrouch, right along the Border with Belgium.

It has a population of 23.

Slate industry 
During the 19th century, mines in Haut-Martelange were one of the main exporters of slate in Europe.

The village of Haut-Martelange formed around underground slate mines, which were established towards the end of the 17th century in the valley Haut-Martelange is located in.

The importance of the site grew significantly after investments were made by the Rother family from Frankfurt. The connection of Haut-Martelange to the Noerdange-Martelange railway line (Jhangeli) in 1890 gave the possibility for high-volume exports to the whole of Europe.

During this time, the slate mines of Haut-Martelange accounted for a significant amount of Luxembourg's exports and were a major provider of labour in the region. The underground mines grew to become among the most important in Europe.

The extraction of slate stopped in 1986 after the death of Christiane Rother in 1985, the last descendant of the Rother family.

Today, a museum has been established in the disused slate facilities.

Gallery

References 

Villages in Luxembourg